Karen Morris-Gowdy (born January 20, 1956 in Cheyenne, Wyoming) is an American actress, best known for her role as Dr. Faith Coleridge Desmond #4 on Ryan's Hope, a role she played from 1978 to 1984 and again in 1989.

Morris-Gowdy was crowned America's Junior Miss in 1974. She served as emcee of the preliminary finals in 1979 and 1992 and served as a judge in 1980 and 1983. She served on the Board of Directors from 1981 until 1990.

Morris-Gowdy appeared in a Ban Roll-On deodorant tv commercial in 1987.

Morris-Gowdy has been married to Curt Gowdy Jr., son of hall of fame sportscaster Curt Gowdy, since 1979. Together they have three children.

External links

American soap opera actresses
Living people
1956 births
Actresses from Wyoming
21st-century American women